Darren Scott McCaughan (born March 18, 1996) is an American professional baseball pitcher in the Seattle Mariners organization. He made his Major League Baseball (MLB) debut in 2021.

Amateur career
McCaughan attended Los Alamitos High School in Los Alamitos, California. He committed to play college baseball at Long Beach State University during his junior year in 2013. As a junior, he went 6–4 with a 2.96 ERA. Undrafted out of high school in the 2014 MLB draft, he enrolled at Long Beach State where he played college baseball for the Dirtbags.

As a freshman at Long Beach State in 2015, McCaughan went 4–2 with a 2.47 ERA in 23 games (three starts). In 2016, as a sophomore, he pitched to a 10–1 record with a 2.03 ERA in 16 starts, earning the title of Big West Pitcher of the Year. He was named an All-American by multiple outlets including Collegiate Baseball and Perfect Game. That summer, he played for the USA Baseball Collegiate National Team. In 2017, a junior, McCaughan compiled a 9–2 record with a 2.50 ERA in 17 starts. He was named Big West Pitcher of the Year for the second consecutive year along with being named an All-American by D1Baseball among various other media sources. After the year, he was drafted by the Seattle Mariners in the 12th round of the 2017 MLB draft.

Professional career
McCaughan signed with Seattle and made his professional with the Rookie-level Arizona League Mariners, going 0–1 with a 3.75 ERA in 12 innings. He spent the 2018 season with the Modesto Nuts of the Class A-Advanced California League, where he pitched to a 6–10 record and a 3.05 ERA in 25 starts and was named an All-Star. He also made one spot start for the Tacoma Rainers of the Class AAA Pacific Coast League in June. He began 2019 with the Arkansas Travelers of the Class AA Texas League, with whom he was named an All-Star alongside earning the title of Texas League Pitcher of the Year after going 7–5 with a 2.89 ERA over 17 starts. In July, he was promoted to Tacoma, going 0–6 with an 8.09 ERA over nine starts.

McCaughan did not play a minor league game in 2020 due to the cancellation of the minor league season caused by the COVID-19 pandemic. He returned to Arkansas to begin the 2021 season, now members of the Double-A Central. After one start, he was promoted to Tacoma, now a part of the Triple-A West. On July 21, 2021, McCaughan was selected to the 40-man roster and promoted to the major leagues for the first time. He made his MLB debut that day pitching in relief against the Colorado Rockies, throwing five innings in which he gave up no hits and one earned run while walking three batters. On October 22, the Mariners outrighted him to Tacoma.

References

External links

1996 births
Living people
Baseball players from Long Beach, California
Major League Baseball pitchers
Seattle Mariners players
Long Beach State Dirtbags baseball players
Arizona League Mariners players
Modesto Nuts players
Arkansas Travelers players
Tacoma Rainiers players